The Women's Team Pursuit is one of the 9 women's events at the 2010 UCI Track Cycling World Championships, held in Ballerup, Denmark.

Fifteen teams of 3 cyclists each participated in the contest. After the qualifying, the fastest 2 teams raced for gold, and 3rd and 4th teams raced for bronze.

The Qualifying and the Finals were held on March 25.

World record

Qualifying

Finals

References

Qualifying Results
Finals Results

Women's team pursuit
UCI Track Cycling World Championships – Women's team pursuit